Dame Joan Mary Ruddock,  (née Anthony; born 28 December 1943) is a British Labour Party politician who served as the Member of Parliament (MP) for Lewisham Deptford from 1987 to 2015. Ruddock was Minister of State for Energy at the Department of Energy and Climate Change until 11 May 2010. She stood down at the 2015 general election.

Early life
Ruddock was educated at Pontypool Girls' Grammar School and at Imperial College London where she studied Botany and Chemistry. Prior to her election to Parliament, she was chair of the Campaign for Nuclear Disarmament, a UK pressure group; she resigned in 1985.

Parliamentary career
Ruddock fought the safe Conservative seat of Newbury in 1979, coming third. She was elected for Lewisham Deptford in 1987, succeeding John Silkin. She was initially a member of the Campaign Group but resigned in 1988 in protest at Tony Benn's decision to challenge Neil Kinnock for the leadership.

During the government of Tony Blair, she briefly served as Minister for Women. She returned to government when Gordon Brown appointed her Parliamentary Under-Secretary of State at the Department for Environment, Food and Rural Affairs in June 2007 with responsibility for biodiversity, climate change adaptation, waste and domestic forestry. In October 2008 she was transferred to the newly created Department of Energy and Climate Change, continuing in her previous role. In the June 2009 reshuffle she was promoted to Minister of State level, with responsibility for energy policy, which she held until the fall of the Labour Government in 2010.

During her time in Parliament Ruddock was responsible for successfully introducing two private members bills on fly tipping and ensuring local authorities provided doorstep recycling.

She is an Honorary Fellow of Goldsmiths, University of London, an Honorary Fellow of Laban London and a member of the Board of Trinity Laban.

She was appointed as a Privy Counsellor on 9 June 2010. She was appointed a Dame Commander of the Order of the British Empire (DBE) in the 2012 New Year Honours for public and political services.

Private life
Ruddock's first husband was Keith Harrhy Ruddock, Professor of Biophysics at Imperial College London, whom she married in 1963, He died in a traffic accident in 1996; the couple had separated in 1990. Her second marriage was to the former Labour MP for Aberdeen North, Frank Doran from 2010 until his death in 2017.

References

External links

Joan Ruddock audio interview on Women's Parliamentary Radio discussing her job as Minister in charge of Climate Change, Waste and Recycling and Biodiversity in the Department for Environment, Food and Rural Affairs.

1943 births
Living people
Members of the Privy Council of the United Kingdom
Alumni of Imperial College London
Associates of the Royal College of Science
Female members of the Parliament of the United Kingdom for English constituencies
British anti–nuclear weapons activists
Campaign for Nuclear Disarmament activists
Dames Commander of the Order of the British Empire
Labour Party (UK) MPs for English constituencies
People from Pontypool
Transport and General Workers' Union-sponsored MPs
UK MPs 1987–1992
UK MPs 1992–1997
UK MPs 1997–2001
UK MPs 2001–2005
UK MPs 2005–2010
UK MPs 2010–2015
20th-century British women politicians
21st-century British women politicians
20th-century English women
20th-century English people
21st-century English women
21st-century English people
Spouses of British politicians